Blackpink (commonly stylized in all caps or as BLɅϽKPIИK) is a South Korean girl group formed by YG Entertainment, consisting of members Jisoo, Jennie, Rosé, and Lisa. The group debuted in August 2016 with their single album Square One, which featured "Whistle" and "Boombayah", their first number-one entries on South Korea's Gaon Digital Chart and the US Billboard World Digital Song Sales chart, respectively.

Referred to as the "biggest girl group in the world", Blackpink is the most successful Korean girl group internationally. They are the highest-charting female Korean act on the US Billboard Hot 100, peaking at number 13 with "Ice Cream" (2020), and on the Billboard 200, peaking at number one with their second studio album Born Pink (2022), which is the best-selling album of all time by a female act in South Korea and the first to sell over two million copies. They were the first girl group to top the Billboard Artist 100 and the first Korean girl group to enter and top the Billboard Emerging Artists chart. Blackpink also became the first female Korean act to receive a certification from the Recording Industry Association of America (RIAA) with their single "Ddu-Du Ddu-Du" (2018). Their 2018 song "Kiss and Make Up", a collaboration with Dua Lipa, was the first by a Korean group to receive a certification from the British Phonographic Industry (BPI) and a platinum certification from the Australian Recording Industry Association (ARIA). Blackpink's debut studio album, The Album (2020), became the best-selling album of all time by a Korean girl group and the highest-charting female Korean album on the Billboard 200 at number two, records both surpassed by Born Pink. Born Pink was the first album by a girl group to reach number one on the Billboard 200 since Danity Kane in 2008 and set two Guinness World Records as the first album by a Korean girl group to top the Billboard 200 as well as the UK Albums Chart. The album's lead single "Pink Venom" (2022) was the first song by a Korean group to top the ARIA Singles Chart and the first song by a girl group to top the Billboard Global 200.

Blackpink has broken numerous online records throughout their career. Their music video for "Ddu-Du Ddu-Du" was the first by a Korean group to surpass one billion views as well as two billion views and is currently the most-viewed by a Korean group on YouTube. Blackpink's music videos for "Kill This Love" (2019) and "How You Like That" (2020) each set records for the most-viewed music video within the first 24 hours of release, with the latter breaking three and setting two Guinness World Records. They are the most-subscribed music artist and own the most-viewed music group channel on YouTube, and are the most-followed and most-streamed girl group on Spotify. Their other accolades include the New Artist of the Year Award at the Golden Disc Awards and Seoul Music Awards, the MAMA Award for Best Female Group in 2020 and 2022, the first MTV Video Music Award won by a Korean girl group, the first Brit Award nomination for a Korean girl group, and recognition as the first female Korean group on Forbes 30 Under 30 Asia and as Times 2022 Entertainer of the Year. They have been acknowledged as one of the most powerful celebrities in South Korea by Forbes Korea (placing first in 2019, third in 2020, and second in 2021) and by former South Korean President Moon Jae-in as a global K-pop phenomenon helping spread K-pop content worldwide.

Career

2010–2016: Formation and pre-debut activities 
Blackpink began forming when YG Entertainment held tryouts worldwide for preteen or teenage recruits to create a new girl group after launching its first major one, 2NE1, in 2009. According to the members, joining the label as trainees was akin to enrolling in a full-time pop-star academy, with Jennie describing the experience as "more strict than school" and Rosé comparing it to The X Factor with dorm rooms. For members who had left their lives outside of South Korea, the pace of training alongside the culture shock was especially difficult. Preparations for Blackpink's debut began as early as 2011, when YG Entertainment revealed on November 14 that their new girl group would debut in the early half of 2012 and feature at least seven members. Since then, numerous news and rumors surfaced surrounding the new girl group's debut being delayed, although there had been no official information. It was only on May 18, 2016, that YG Entertainment confirmed the girl group would debut that July, stating that the members were selected through years of stiff competition. The label later confirmed that Jang Hanna and Moon Sua, who were introduced to the public as potential members of the new girl group, were not included in the lineup.

Jennie was the first group member revealed, on June 1, 2016. She joined YG Entertainment as a trainee in 2010 after moving back to South Korea from New Zealand. She had been introduced to the public for the first time in 2012 in a photo titled "Who's that girl?" on YG Entertainment's website on April 10. Jennie continued to be promoted as a member of the new girl group through multiple collaborations: she starred in G-Dragon's 2012 music video for "That XX" from his One of a Kind EP and featured in the song "Black" from his 2013 album Coup d'etat (2013) and Lee Hi's song "Special" from her album First Love (2013).

Lisa was revealed as the new girl group's second member on June 8, 2016. She was the only individual among 4,000 applicants to pass the 2010 YG Entertainment audition in her native country Thailand and became the label's first foreign trainee in 2011. She was first introduced in May 2012 in a video that was posted on YG Entertainment's YouTube channel, titled "WHO'S THAT GIRL???". Lisa also appeared in the music video for Taeyang's "Ringa Linga" in 2013. She became a spokesperson for street-wear brand Nona9on in 2015 and cosmetics brand Moonshot in 2016.

Jisoo was revealed as the new group's third member on June 15, 2016. She joined YG Entertainment as a trainee in July 2011 and appeared in several advertisements and music videos in her pre-debut years, including "Spoiler + Happy Ending" (2014) from Epik High's studio album Shoebox and Hi Suhyun's music video "I'm Different" (2014). She also made a cameo appearance in 2015 drama The Producers.

Rosé was the final member to be revealed, on June 22, 2016. She ranked first among 700 applicants in the 2012 YG Entertainment audition in Australia, after which she signed a trainee contract with the label and moved to Seoul to begin training. She featured in G-Dragon's track "Without You" (2012) from One of a Kind, credited as "? from YG New Girl Group" until her official public introduction.

On June 29, YG Entertainment confirmed that the new girl group would have four members instead of the originally planned nine and revealed its official name as Blackpink. According to a label representative, the group's name meant "pretty isn't everything" and symbolized that "they are a team that encompasses not only beauty, but also great talent." Jisoo later disclosed in a press conference that other group names under consideration included Pink Punk, Baby Monster, and Magnum. Blackpink released their first dance practice video on July 6, which garnered much public attention. On July 29, YG Entertainment confirmed that Blackpink's debut would be on August 8, 2016.

2016–2017: Debut, rising popularity, and commercial success 

Promotions for the group's debut began in the first week of August 2016 with the release of teaser images, videos, and advertisements. The first girl group to debut under YG Entertainment in seven years, Blackpink released their debut single album, Square One, on August 8, 2016, consisting of tracks "Boombayah" and "Whistle". They charted at number one and two on the Billboard World Digital Song Sales chart, making Blackpink the fastest act to achieve such a feat and the third YG Entertainment artist to hold the top two positions simultaneously, after Psy and Big Bang. "Whistle" quickly topped the Gaon digital, download, streaming, and mobile charts. The group also reached number one on the weekly, popularity, music video, and K-pop music video charts of China's biggest music-streaming service, QQ Music. Blackpink's first music show performance aired on August 14, 2016, on SBS's Inkigayo. They won first place on Inkigayo thirteen days after their debut, breaking the then-record for the shortest time from debut for a girl group to win on a music program. They wrapped up promotions for Square One on September 11, 2016, with another win on Inkigayo.

Blackpink released their second single album, Square Two, consisting of tracks "Playing with Fire" and "Stay", on November 1, 2016. The group began promotions on Inkigayo on November 6 and on Mnet's M Countdown on November 10. "Playing with Fire" was Blackpink's second single to reach number one on the Billboard World Digital Song Sales chart and the first K-pop girl group song to chart on the Canadian Hot 100. In South Korea, "Playing with Fire" peaked at number three, while "Stay" placed in the top ten. Blackpink's commercial success in their first five months earned them several rookie awards at major Korean year-end music award shows, including the Asia Artist Awards, Melon Music Awards, Golden Disc Awards, Seoul Music Awards, and Gaon Chart Music Awards. Additionally, Billboard named them one of the best new K-pop groups of 2016.

On January 17, 2017, Blackpink revealed the name of their fan club—"Blink", a portmanteau of "black" and "pink". On June 22, the group released their first standalone digital single, "As If It's Your Last". It was described as a "mixed genre of music" and a change of sound from their previous releases. The song peaked at number three on the Gaon Digital Chart and at number 13 on Billboards Bubbling Under Hot 100 chart, which gave them the highest-charting Korean song by a group in America at the time and made Blackpink the highest-charting Korean group since Wonder Girls in 2009. It also debuted at number one on Billboards World Digital Song Sales chart one day after release, making it their third number-one on the chart. The music video for the song later went on to break the record for the most-liked music video by a Korean girl group on YouTube, as well as the most-viewed K-pop group music video in the first 24 hours of release. On July 20, 2017, Blackpink held a showcase at Nippon Budokan in Tokyo, which was attended by over 14,000 people, with as many as 200,000 people attempting to purchase tickets. The group made their Japanese debut on August 30, 2017, with the release of a self-titled Japanese extended play that included Japanese versions of their previous singles. The EP debuted and peaked atop the Oricon Albums Chart. Blackpink ranked among YouTube's Global Top 25 Songs of the Summer for 2017 with "As If It's Your Last".

2018–2019: International breakthrough and first world tour 
On January 6, 2018, Blackpink released the first episode of their first reality show, Blackpink House, which comprised 12 episodes released throughout 2018 following the four members spending 100 days of vacation as they moved into their new dorm, via their official V Live and YouTube channels. On March 28, Blackpink re-released their debut Japanese EP under the name Re:Blackpink. The digital version included the same songs as the original release, while the physical version included a DVD of all their music videos and six songs in the Korean language.

On June 15, 2018, the group released their first Korean-language EP, Square Up. In South Korea, Square Up debuted at number one on Gaon Albums Chart and was certified Platinum by the Korea Music Content Association (KMCA) for selling 250,000 units. The lead single, "Ddu-Du Ddu-Du", peaked at number one on the digital, download, streaming, and mobile charts on Gaon for three weeks, while "Forever Young" peaked at number two; both songs were certified Platinum by the KMCA for surpassing 2,500,000 downloads and 100,000,000 streams in the country. "Ddu-Du Ddu-Du" debuted at number 55 on the Billboard Hot 100, making Blackpink the highest-charting Korean girl group in the US, and at number 39 on the U.S. Streaming Songs chart, making Blackpink the first K-pop girl group to enter the chart. Square Up also brought the group their first entry and the highest-charting album by an all-female K-pop group at the time of its release on the Billboard 200, debuting at number 40. The EP also topped the Billboard World Albums chart. YouTube's official tally saw the music video for "Ddu-Du Ddu-Du" garner a total of 36.2 million views within 24 hours after its release, making it the most-viewed online video in the first 24 hours by a Korean act and the second most-watched music video of all time in first 24 hours of release at the time.

Blackpink embarked on their sold-out first Japan tour, Blackpink Arena Tour 2018, in Osaka from July 24 to 25 to promote their Japanese EP. The tour was initially set for six shows across Osaka, Fukuoka and Chiba, but an additional show in Chiba was added due to overwhelming demand. A final tour stop was later added for December 24 at Kyocera Dome Osaka as a Christmas gift for fans, where Blackpink performed to a sold-out crowd of 50,000 people. On September 12, it was announced that the group would hold their first concert in Seoul, Blackpink 2018 Tour [In Your Area] Seoul x BC Card, at the Olympic Gymnastics Arena. The concert was the first show of the In Your Area World Tour, which continued throughout 2019 and early 2020 in North America, Europe, Oceania and Asia. By the end of its run, the tour became the highest-grossing tour by a Korean girl group.

On October 19, 2018, English singer Dua Lipa released "Kiss and Make Up" with Blackpink, a new track on the re-released edition of her self-titled debut album. "Kiss and Make Up" became the group's second entry in the UK Singles Chart, peaking at number 36, and their first top 40 entry. They were the first female Korean group and third Korean act overall to reach the top 40. It also debuted at number 93 on the Billboard Hot 100, marking Blackpink's second entry in the chart and making them the only Korean girl group to score multiple entries on the chart.

In October 2018, the group signed with Interscope Records in a global partnership with YG Entertainment; they were to be represented by Interscope and Universal Music Group outside of Asia. In November 2018, Blackpink announced additional tour dates for their In Your Area World Tour, which covered thirteen dates across Asia from January to March 2019. Jennie made her solo debut with her single "Solo" at Blackpink's Seoul concert on November 11; both the song and its official music video were released the following day. Their first Japanese studio album, Blackpink in Your Area, was made available digitally on November 23 and physically on December 5. The album included Japanese versions of all of their previous releases and debuted at number nine on the Oricon Albums Chart.

Blackpink made their American debut at the Universal Music Group's 2019 Grammy Artist Showcase, an invite-only event at the ROW in Downtown Los Angeles on February 9, 2019. The group subsequently appeared on several American television shows, including The Late Show with Stephen Colbert and Good Morning America. That March, they became the first-ever K-pop girl group to cover Billboard magazine.

Blackpink's third extended play, Kill This Love, was released on April 5, 2019, alongside a single of the same name. The EP debuted at number three on the Gaon Album Chart and was certified 2× Platinum for selling 500,000 units in the country, and the lead single peaked at number two on the Gaon Digital Chart. Kill This Love also debuted at number 24 on the Billboard 200, while the lead single reached number 41 on the Hot 100, becoming the highest-charting releases by a female Korean act on the two major Billboard charts. "Kill This Love" ranked at number 66 on Billboards list of the 100 Best Songs of 2019. Following the EP's release, Blackpink performed at the 2019 Coachella Valley Music and Arts Festival on April 12 and 19, 2019, making them the first female K-pop group to do so. The group's Coachella set was well received by both critics and fans alike, with Gab Ginsberg of Billboard calling the show "electrifying" and "unforgettable".

On October 16, 2019, a Japanese version of Kill This Love was released to the Japanese market, peaking at number 17 on the Oricon Albums Chart. The group embarked to Japan for a variety of promotional activities, including appearances on Japanese music television programs TV Asahi's Music Station and Fuji TV's Love Music. Blackpink were voted PAPER magazine's K-pop Sensation of the Year for the 2019 edition of their annual Break the Internet Awards™ list.

2020–2021: The Album and The Show 
On April 22, it was confirmed the group would be working with Lady Gaga on her sixth studio album, Chromatica. Their collaboration, "Sour Candy", was released as a promotional single on May 28, 2020. On the Billboard Hot 100, the song debuted at number 33, giving Blackpink their first top 40 hit and becoming the group's highest-charting song in the US at the time, as well as the highest-charting song by a K-pop girl group. In Australia, the song debuted at number eight, becoming Blackpink's highest-charting hit in the country. It was also their first top-twenty single in the UK, debuting at number 17.

On May 18, YG Entertainment announced the group would release a pre-release single in June, followed by an additional single release between July and August, to promote their first Korean studio album. On June 2, YG Entertainment confirmed that following the release of the studio album, members Rosé, Lisa, and Jisoo would release individual projects, with Rosé's coming first. In the midst of the group's comeback preparations, YG Entertainment released a prologue of Blackpink's newest reality show, 24/365 with Blackpink, on June 13, ahead of its launch on YouTube. The show documents their 2020 comebacks alongside sharing their daily lives through vlogs. The single "How You Like That" was heavily teased on social media in the lead up to its digital release on June 26. It peaked at number one on the Gaon Digital, Download, and Streaming charts for three weeks. "How You Like That" became Blackpink's fifth song to chart on the Billboard Hot 100 (peaking at number 33), and its music video broke five Guinness World Records. The song ranked first in Youtube Music's Global Top 10 Songs of Summer 2020 and won Song of Summer at the 2020 MTV Video Music Awards, making Blackpink the first Korean female act to win at the award show. On July 23, YG Entertainment announced that a second single, "Ice Cream" with American singer Selena Gomez, would be released on August 28. "Ice Cream" debuted and peaked at number 13 on the Billboard Hot 100, making it Blackpink's highest-charting song. Its debut at number 39 in the United Kingdom, made Blackpink the Korean artist with the most top-40 hits (five) in that region at the time.

Blackpink released their first Korean studio album, The Album, on October 2, 2020, with "Lovesick Girls" as its third and main single. Leading up to the exclusive video premiere of their music video for "Lovesick Girls", Blackpink appeared on YouTube's new original music show Released as its first featured artist, which included "unfiltered access" moments of the group. The Album peaked at number two on the Billboard 200 and the UK Albums Chart, making Blackpink the highest-charting Korean female act on each. The album also set a first-week album sales record for a Korean girl group, with 590,000 copies sold in just one day after the physical album's release. Blackpink became the first-ever million-selling K-pop girl group with The Album, selling approximately 1.2 million copies in less than one month after release. Blackpink performed "Lovesick Girls" on Good Morning America and Jimmy Kimmel Live! in the United States on October 21.

The group's first documentary film, Blackpink: Light Up the Sky, premiered on Netflix on October 14, 2020, and covered the four years since the group's debut in 2016. The documentary included footage from their training days, looks at their home lives, behind-the-scenes stories and interviews with the members, as well as glimpses into the making of The Album. The commercial success of The Album, combined with the group's Netflix documentary, resulted in Blackpink topping Bloombergs Pop Star Power Ranking for the month of October; they were the first Korean artist to top the ranking since its inception in April of that year.

On December 2, Blackpink announced their collaboration with YouTube Music for their first livestream concert. The live event, dubbed "The Show", was initially set to take place on December 27, 2020, but was rescheduled to January 31, 2021, due to new COVID-19 pandemic regulations introduced in South Korea. The concert featured the first-ever live performances of several songs from The Album, as well as of Rosé's song "Gone" from her first solo single album R. More than 280,000 people purchased memberships to access the show, and the concert was livestreamed across 100 countries.

Blackpink released a Japanese version of The Album on August 3, 2021, with Japanese versions for four out of the eight tracks ("How You Like That", "Pretty Savage", "Lovesick Girls", and "You Never Know"), which peaked at number three on the Oricon Albums Chart. To promote the album, they appeared on Japanese music television programs such as TV Asahi's Music Station. On August 4, a documentary film entitled Blackpink: The Movie was released into theaters in South Korea and worldwide, which included exclusive interviews with the group as well as live performances from The Show and the In Your Area World Tour.

2022–present: Born Pink and second world tour

On July 6, 2022, YG Entertainment announced that Blackpink was in the final stages of recording for a new album, with plans to record a music video in mid-July and release a new song in August. They also confirmed that the group would embark on their second world tour at the end of the year. On July 12, YG Entertainment revealed that Blackpink would hold a virtual in-game concert called Blackpink: The Virtual in PUBG Mobile from July 22 to 30, including performances of the group's hit songs as well as a special track titled "Ready for Love" to be previewed during the event for the first time. "Ready for Love" was released in full with an animated music video on July 29.

On July 31, it was announced that Blackpink would release a pre-release single titled "Pink Venom" on August 19, ahead of their second album in September, followed by an accompanying world tour, which began in Seoul on October 15 and is expected to run through June 2023. Upon release, "Pink Venom" topped the Billboard Global 200 for two weeks, becoming the first number-one song by a girl group as well as the first Korean song to top the chart for multiple weeks. It peaked at number two on South Korea's Circle Digital Chart and number 22 on the Billboard Hot 100 and became the first song by a K-pop group to top the ARIA Singles Chart. On August 28, Blackpink performed "Pink Venom" at the 2022 MTV Video Music Awards, making them the first female K-pop group in history to perform at the show, and won the award for Best Metaverse Performance for The Virtual.

On September 16, 2022, Blackpink released their second studio album Born Pink alongside the single "Shut Down", which became their second song to top the Billboard Global 200. "Shut Down" peaked at number three on the Circle Digital Chart and number 24 on the Billboard Hot 100. Born Pink debuted at number one on the Circle Album Chart with 2,141,281 copies sold in less than two days of tracking and became the first album by a K-pop girl group to sell over two million copies. In the United States, Born Pink debuted at number one on the Billboard 200, the first album by a female Korean act to top the chart and the first album by a female group to do so since Danity Kane's Welcome to the Dollhouse in 2008. In the United Kingdom, Born Pink also became the first album by a K-pop girl group to reach number one on the UK Albums Chart. It marked the first time a girl group simultaneously topped the album charts in the United States and United Kingdom since Destiny's Child's Survivor in 2001.

On October 21, it was announced Blackpink would headline BST Hyde Park in London on July 2, 2023, making them the first K-pop act to headline a major UK festival. In December, the group was named 2022 Entertainer of the Year by Time magazine. On January 10, 2023, it was announced that Blackpink would be one of the headliners for the Coachella Valley Music and Arts Festival, set to perform on April 15 and 22 and become the first Korean group to headline the festival. On January 28, Blackpink performed "Pink Venom" and "Shut Down" with musicians Gautier Capuçon and Daniel Lozakovich at the Le Gala des Pièces Jaunes charity event organized by the First Lady of France, Brigitte Macron, in Paris.

Artistry

Musical style and influences 
Blackpink's music has been characterized as primarily EDM and pop with elements of hip hop and trap, although they have incorporated a variety of other genres in their discography, such as R&B, Arabic music, ballad, disco and rock. They tend to feature bass drops frequently in their songs, especially immediately preceding the chorus, which some publications consider part of their characteristic sound. Vocally, Blackpink's music has been described as combining fierce and bold rapping with frequent use of an "edgy" singing style. Jisoo explained in an interview with Rolling Stone that the members are "involved from the beginning" in their creative process, from "building the blocks" to "adding this or that feeling" and "exchanging feedback". About their music, Billboard stated that Blackpink "rewrote the definition of K-pop and their beauty, It's for them not for anyone else."

Early in their career, Blackpink stated that they wanted to emulate labelmate 2NE1 and "show [their] own unique color". Blackpink cited various other artists as their musical influences, including Lady Gaga, Ariana Grande, Cardi B and Selena Gomez.

Concept, image and lyrical themes
Blackpink's concept is represented by their group name; the "black" side represents their more mature, "girl crush" image, while the "pink" side represents their more cute and colorful image. In an interview with Jimmy Kimmel, Rosé explained that the group feels that "there's two colors that represented us the most 'cause we're very girly but at the same time we're very savage too," naming their song "Pretty Savage" as the song that described them best because "it kind of goes with 'black pink.'" Cultural critic Jung Deok-hyeon analyzed that Blackpink established a "confident" image and had "a solid fandom centered on women." At the press conference commemorating the release of "Pink Venom" in August 2022, Jennie said about the group's identity: "We try to express various messages through songs of various genres but Blackpink is always confident and full of confidence, I thought we were the closest.” The group's lyrics generally address themes of independence, female empowerment, breakups, and toxic relationships, as well as summer romances.

Public image and impact 

Since their debut, Blackpink have emerged as a prominent act in K-pop and have been labeled the "biggest girl group in the world", "biggest K-pop girl band on the planet", and "K-pop Queens". Insider wrote that they "[burst] onto the K-pop scene with a set of singles that set them on a path to becoming the ambassadors of the 'girl crush' concept", encapsulating "confidence, sexiness, and inspirational assurance, in the K-pop landscape." Billboard called them "K-pop's most visible representatives" of girl crush following their 2018 release "Ddu-Du Ddu-Du". In South Korea, they ranked first on Forbes Korea Power Celebrity 40 list in 2019, third in 2020, and second in 2021. International media outlets such as Forbes, Billboard and The Hollywood Reporter have recognized the group's popularity and contribution toward spreading the Korean Wave globally. Blackpink were cited by Rolling Stone as an exception to the stereotype that most successful K-pop acts in the United States are boy groups.

The group was also credited as one of the two acts leading Korean music industry growth by the International Federation of the Phonographic Industry (IFPI). Blackpink have appeared in multiple power listings. They were the first girl group to make Forbes 30 Under 30 Asia and were named to the 2019 Time 100 Next list of rising stars, credited with "heralding a new era of Korean acts stepping past language barriers to play global stages" when they became the first K-pop group to perform at Coachella, the world's largest music festival. In another first for a Korean act, Blackpink were named the biggest musicians in the world in the month of October 2020 in Bloomberg's Pop Star Power Ranking. People magazine included Blackpink on their list of women changing the music industry. They became the third girl group in history to cover Rolling Stone, after the Spice Girls and Destiny's Child, when they covered the magazine's June 2022 issue.

Blackpink have amassed a large following on social media and streaming platforms. They became the most-subscribed music group on YouTube in September 2019, the most-subscribed female artist in July 2020, and the most-subscribed music act overall in September 2021, with nearly 82 million subscribers as of September 2022. On Instagram, the group's members are also the four most-followed individuals based in South Korea (in order from first to fourth: Lisa, Jennie, Jisoo and Rosé). Blackpink became the most-followed girl group on Spotify in November 2019; as of September 2022, they have over 31 million followers.

Especially in South Korea, Blackpink's influence also extends to fashion. Each member has served as global ambassadors for different luxury brands: Jisoo for Dior, Jennie for Chanel, Rosé for Yves Saint Laurent, and Lisa for Bulgari and Celine. Additionally, Blackpink have been credited for drawing international attention to South Korean hanbok through their modern re-interpretations of the traditional costume in their "How You Like That" music video and performances. The group considers fashion to be an important part of their public image, with Jennie telling Elle magazine that it "definitely empowers us as much as music does" and Rosé describing it as inseparable from their music. Their style has been noted for blending group uniformity with individual tastes.

Other ventures

Endorsements 
Blackpink have acquired numerous endorsement deals in various industries throughout their career. Globally, Blackpink were ambassadors for Kia Motors, which also served as title sponsor for the group's In Your Area World Tour. In North America, Blackpink partnered with toy company Jazwares to create a collection of dolls styled in outfits from their music videos, as well as other collectible toy lines. In June 2020, Blackpink collaborated with ZEPETO, a South Korean 3D avatar service operated by Naver Z, to offer fans characters that correspond to each member that allow fans to see the characters sing and dance, as well as take pictures together on the app. Blackpink's virtual fan-sign event on the app was popular among international fans, with the service surpassing 30 million participants as of September 11, 2020, and the number of new users increasing by 300,000 following the release of the "Ice Cream" dance performance video. Additionally, the group also teamed up with the popular battle royale game PUBG Mobile to release collaborative content and events within the game.

In Asia, Blackpink endorsed Samsung, working with the company on multiple campaigns to promote its electronics products, such as the #danceAwesome challenge to promote Galaxy A. In August 2019, Samsung launched a Blackpink Special Edition set in Southeast Asia, comprising its Galaxy A80, Galaxy Watch Active, and Galaxy Buds. The group featured Galaxy S10+ and Galaxy Buds in their "Kill This Love" music video. In November 2018, Blackpink became the first-ever regional brand ambassadors for Singaporean e-commerce platform, Shopee, as part of its partnership with YG Group in Southeast Asia and Taiwan. Thai bank KBank began its partnership with Blackpink in November 2019. In September 2020, Blackpink became spokesperson for Pepsi in the Asia-Pacific region, including Greater China, Philippines, Thailand and Vietnam. Philippine telecommunications company Globe Telecom began its partnership with Blackpink in December 2020 as its brand ambassadors.

In South Korea, Blackpink have been brand ambassadors or spoke-models of sportswear brand Adidas, luxury hotel and resort Paradise City, contact lens brand Olens, and hair-care brand Mise-En-Scène. In July 2018 and August 2020, the group ranked first among all artists in brand reputation based on analyses by The Korea Reputation Research Institute, making them the only female act to do so. In May 2017, Blackpink became honorary ambassadors for customs service company Incheon Main Customs; banners and videos featuring their images would greet foreign travelers at Incheon International Airport. In April 2018, Blackpink began advertising Sprite Korea. In January 2019, the group became the face of Woori Bank. The group also endorsed and collaborated with other high-end brands, such as sportswear brands Puma and Reebok, luxury fashion houses Louis Vuitton and Dior Cosmetics, cosmetics brand Moonshot, handbag brand St. Scott London, and department store Shibuya 109. Blackpink also released merchandise in collaboration with Tokyo Girls Collection x Cecil McBee in Japan.

Philanthropy 
In December 2018, Blackpink donated their prize money from the Elle Style Awards 2018, worth ₩20 million (around US$16,630), to low-income and single-parent households in South Korea. In April 2019, Blackpink made a donation of ₩40 million (around US$33,300) to the Hope Bridge Association of the National Disaster Relief for the victims of the Goseong wildfire in South Korea, doing the same in March 2022 by donating ₩500 million to pay for damage repair caused by the wildfires happening in Gangwon and Gyeongbuk In April 2020, Blackpink released face masks via UMG-affiliated merchandising company Bravado; all proceeds benefited the Recording Academy's MusiCares initiative, which launched a relief fund in response to the COVID-19 pandemic and its impact on the music industry. In December 2020, the group called for action on climate change and promoted the 2021 United Nations Climate Change Conference (COP26), hoping their fans will "join us on this journey" to "learn about what's happening, what needs to happen and how we can play our part." On February 25, 2021, Blackpink were formally appointed official advocates for COP26 in Seoul, where they received a personal appreciation letter written by the Prime Minister of the United Kingdom, Boris Johnson, for their work in the spread of climate change awareness. On October 23, 2021, the group was a part of the lineup for the YouTube Originals special entitled "Dear Earth", which focused on encouraging viewers to become more environmentally conscious.

Awards and achievements 

Blackpink's accolades include thirteen Circle Chart Music Awards, seven Golden Disc Awards, eleven MAMA Awards, five Melon Music Awards, two MTV Video Music Awards, one MTV Europe Music Award, three People's Choice Awards, three Seoul Music Awards, one Teen Choice Award, and ten Guinness World Records. They are the first Korean girl group to win an MTV Video Music Award and the first to receive nominations at the Billboard Music Awards and the Brit Awards.

Their music video for "Ddu-Du Ddu-Du" became the most-watched music video by a South Korean group in January 2019 and became the first K-pop group music video to surpass one billion views in November 2019 and two billion views in January 2023. Following the release of "How You Like That" and its music video on June 26, 2020, Blackpink broke five Guinness World Records, including those for the most-viewed YouTube video in the first 24 hours of release (with 86.3 million views) and the most viewers for a video premiere on YouTube (reaching 1.66 million peak concurrent viewers for the live premiere).

In 2021, Blackpink was awarded the Guinness World Record for the most-subscribed band on YouTube, with over 60 million subscribers. In 2022, Blackpink was awarded three further Guinness World Records, the first for being the inaugural winner of the Best Metaverse Performance category at the MTV Video Music Awards, and the latter two for being the first K-pop girl group to top the UK and US album charts respectively with their second studio album Born Pink. In 2023, Blackpink was awarded the Guinness World Record for the most-streamed female group on Spotify, with over 8.8 billion streams on the platform.

Blackpink were recognized as one of the ten "2020 Visionary" figures, selected by CJ E&M, who inspired the global public with their pioneering work for Korean pop culture in 2020. In 2022, Time named Blackpink the Entertainer of the Year for their global superstardom and their impact both as a group and individually in the music, fashion, and acting industries.

Members 
 Jisoo – vocalist
 Jennie – rapper, vocalist
 Rosé – vocalist, dancer
Lisa – dancer, rapper

Discography 

 The Album (2020)
 Born Pink (2022)

Concerts and tours 

Headlining tours
 Blackpink Arena Tour (2018)
 In Your Area World Tour (2018–2020)
 Born Pink World Tour (2022–2023)
Headlining concerts
 Blackpink Japan Premium Debut Showcase (2017)
 Livestream Concert: The Show (2021)

Filmography 

 Blackpink House (2018, V Live / YouTube / JTBC2)
YG Future Strategy Office (2018, Netflix)
Blackpink X Star Road (2018, V Live)
Blackpink Diaries (2019, V Live / YouTube)
24/365 with Blackpink (2020, YouTube)
Blackpink: Light Up the Sky (2020, Netflix)
Blackpink: The Movie (2021)
Born Pink Memories (2022, YouTube)

Notes

See also 
 List of best-selling girl groups

References

External links 

  

 
2016 establishments in South Korea
Articles containing video clips
Interscope Records artists
K-pop music groups
MAMA Award winners
Melon Music Award winners
Musical groups established in 2016
Musical groups from Seoul
Musical quartets
Shorty Award winners
South Korean girl groups
Universal Music Group artists
World record holders
YG Entertainment artists